After Midnight is a 1948 thriller novel by the German writer Martha Albrand, who had been living in the United States since 1937. It was initially serialized in a slightly different version under the title Dishonored in The Saturday Evening Post.

Synopsis
During World War II American OSS operative Webster Carr was betrayed to the Germans on a small Italian island. After the war he returns again to uncover who it was who gave him away.

Film adaptation
In 1950 it was adapted into the Hollywood film Captain Carey, U.S.A. directed by Mitchell Leisen and starring Alan Ladd, Wanda Hendrix and Francis Lederer.

References

Bibliography
 Deutsch, James I. Coming Home from "The Good War": World War II Veterans as Depicted in American Film and Fiction. George Washington University, 1991.
 Reilly, John M. Twentieth Century Crime & Mystery Writers. Springer, 2015.

1948 American novels
1948 German novels
Novels by Martha Albrand
German thriller novels
Novels set in Italy
German novels adapted into films
Random House books